Josef Mazura (born 23 April 1956) is a retired Czech football player and currently manager. He played for Czechoslovakia.

As active player, Mazura spent most of his career with Zbrojovka Brno. However, at the end of career he also played for St. Pölten, Hasselt, and Stockerau.

He was a participant at the 1980 Olympic Games, where the Czechoslovak team won the gold medal.

After retiring, he became a coach. He led Petra Drnovice, 1. FC Brno, FC Spartak Trnava and 1. FC Slovácko. He managed SFC Opava, with whom he won Moravian–Silesian Football League in 2010–11 season.

References

1956 births
Living people
Czech footballers
Czechoslovak footballers
Footballers at the 1980 Summer Olympics
Olympic footballers of Czechoslovakia
Olympic gold medalists for Czechoslovakia
Czechoslovakia international footballers
Olympic medalists in football
FC Zbrojovka Brno players
SKN St. Pölten players
SV Stockerau players
Czech football managers
Czech First League managers
FC Zbrojovka Brno managers
FC Fastav Zlín managers
1. FC Slovácko managers
SFC Opava managers
FC Spartak Trnava managers
Expatriate football managers in Slovakia
Expatriate footballers in Austria
Expatriate footballers in Belgium
Czechoslovak expatriate sportspeople in Belgium
Czechoslovak expatriate sportspeople in Austria
Czechoslovak expatriate footballers
Czech expatriate footballers
Czech expatriate sportspeople in Austria
FK Drnovice managers
Medalists at the 1980 Summer Olympics
Association football defenders
People from Vyškov
MFK Karviná managers
Sportspeople from the South Moravian Region